Nemophas batoceroides is a species of beetle in the family Cerambycidae. It was described by James Thomson in 1864. It is known from Indonesia.

References

batoceroides
Beetles described in 1864